2023 in film is an overview of events, including award ceremonies, festivals, a list of country- and genre-specific lists of films released, and notable deaths. Warner Bros and Disney celebrated their centennials in 2023.

Highest-grossing films

Events

Scheduled award ceremonies

Film festivals

2023 films

By country/region
 List of American films of 2023
 List of Australian films of 2023
 List of Bangladeshi films of 2023
 List of British films of 2023
 List of Canadian films of 2023
 List of French films of 2023
 List of German films of 2023
 List of Hong Kong films of 2023
 List of Indian films of 2023
 List of Japanese films of 2023
 List of Pakistani films of 2023
 List of Philippine films of 2023
 List of Russian films of 2023
 List of South Korean films of 2023
 List of Spanish films of 2023

By genre/medium
 List of action films of 2023
 List of animated feature films of 2023
 List of avant-garde films of 2023
 List of crime films of 2023
 List of comedy films of 2023
 List of drama films of 2023
 List of horror films of 2023
 List of science fiction films of 2023
 List of thriller films of 2023

Deaths

References

2023
Film by year